Hellraisers Ball: Caught in the Act is a live music album by the L.A. Guns, released in 2008 and recorded at Penningtons Club in Bradford (UK), on April 8, 2003.

A DVD version was released by Snapper Music in 2005 too. It is the only album to feature Keri Kelli (lead guitar) and Brent Muscat (guitar).

In 2019, was reissue like "Electric Gypsy: Live", with different album cover by Secret Records.

Track listing
"Over the Edge"
"Kiss My Love Goodbye"
"Never Enough"
"Sex Action"
"Revolution"
"Long Time Dead"
"Beautiful"
"Hellraisers Ball"
"Don't Look at Me That Way"
"One More Reason"
"Electric Gypsy"
"The Ballad of Jayne"
"Rip and Tear"

Personnel
 Phil Lewis – lead vocals
 Keri Kelli – lead guitar
 Brent Muscat – guitar
 Adam Hamilton – bass guitar
 Steve Riley – drums

Covered in Guns

Covered in Guns is a cover album released by Phil Lewis's version of L.A. Guns in 2010.

Track listing
"Pour Some Sugar on Me" (Def Leppard cover) – 4:23
"Rock & Roll All Night" (Kiss cover) – 3:36
"Crazy Bitch" (Buckcherry cover) – 3:23
"Don't Fear the Reaper" (Blue Öyster Cult cover) – 4:50
"Check My Brain" (Alice in Chains cover) – 3:41
"Cry Little Sister (Theme from The Lost Boys)" (Gerard McMann cover) – 4:05
"Just Between You and Me" (April Wine cover) – 4:04
"Rock'n Me" (Steve Miller Band cover) – 3:35
"Break My Stride" (Matthew Wilder cover) – 3:06
"Let It Rock" (Kevin Rudolf cover) – 3:29
"Let There Be Rock" (AC/DC cover) – 5:13
"I Love Rock N' Roll" (Arrows cover) – 2:54
"Little St. Nick" (The Beach Boys cover) – 2:08

Personnel
 Phil Lewis – lead vocals
 Stacey Blades – guitar
 Adam Hamilton – bass guitar and keyboards
 Steve Riley – drums

References

L.A. Guns albums
2010 albums
Covers albums
L.A. Guns live albums
2008 live albums